Patric Gösta Hörnqvist (born 1 January 1987) is a Swedish professional ice hockey player and alternate captain for the Florida Panthers in the National Hockey League. He has also played for the Nashville Predators and Pittsburgh Penguins.

Hörnqvist won his first Stanley Cup championship when the Penguins defeated the San Jose Sharks in six games in the 2016 Stanley Cup Finals. In 2017, Hörnqvist scored the Cup-winning goal against his former team, as the Penguins repeated as Stanley Cup champions.

Playing career

Early career
Hörnqvist was born on 1 January 1987 in Sollentuna in Stockholm, Sweden. He began playing hockey in local Sollentuna-club Gillbo IF, and also played minor hockey in Solna SK. Hörnqvist later moved on to play junior hockey in Väsby IK Hockey. He was part of Stockholm/Röd's team in the 2002 TV-pucken and also made some appearances in Väsby's senior team the same season. Hörnqvist played two additional seasons with Väsby, but when head coach Charles Berglund was acquired by Djurgårdens IF in 2004 as assistant coach, Hörnqvist followed.

He played a few games for Djurgården's J20 team during the 2004–05 season and was drafted by Nashville Predators in the seventh round, 230th and last overall in the 2005 NHL Entry Draft. Hörnqvist made his Elitserien debut on 26 September against Timrå IK and played 47 games out of 50 during the 2005–06 Elitserien season scoring five goals and seven points. He became the Elitserien Rookie of the Year in 2007 after a successful second season in Djurgården's regular team, scoring 23 goals and 34 points.

Hörnqvist signed on a three-year contract with Nashville in May 2007 but had already chosen to stay for another season in Djurgården during the previous month. He played another good season scoring 18 goals and 30 points in 53 games; and participated in his first Elitserien playoff when Djurgården met Linköpings HC in the quarterfinals. These games did not go well for Hörnqvist; he recorded only one assist, and his team lost the series 4–1.

Nashville Predators
Hörnqvist moved to North America for the 2008–09 NHL season in hopes of making the Predators' roster. However, he struggled and was assigned to their minor league affiliate, the Milwaukee Admirals of the American Hockey League (AHL), where he spent most of the year. He scored his first NHL goal on 15 October 2008 against Marty Turco of the Dallas Stars, in one of his 28 NHL games that year. Hörnqvist broke out in the 2009–10 NHL season, leading the Predators in goals (30) and tying for the team lead in points with 51.

After the completion of the Predators' lockout-shortened 2012–13 season, Hörnqvist was re-signed to a five-year contract extension on 30 April 2013.

Pittsburgh Penguins
Hörnqvist, along with Nick Spaling, was traded on 27 June 2014, to the Pittsburgh Penguins in exchange for forward James Neal. This trade united him with Sidney Crosby. Crosby and Hörnqvist were drafted in the same year (2005), but Crosby was drafted first and Hörnqvist last.

As the 2014 season started, Hörnqvist was on the Penguins first line with Crosby and Chris Kunitz. He scored his first goal with the Penguins in his first game against the Anaheim Ducks. After returning from an injury and with additional in-season trades, Hörnqvist was on the first line with Crosby and David Perron.

On 29 February 2016, Hörnqvist recorded his first career hat-trick and added an assist in a 6–0 win over the Arizona Coyotes. On 13 April 2016, Hörnqvist recorded his first career playoff hat-trick and added an assist in a 5–2 win over the New York Rangers. Hörnqvist won his first Stanley Cup when the Penguins defeated the Sharks in six games in the 2016 Stanley Cup Finals.

On 11 June 2017, Hörnqvist scored the Stanley Cup-winning goal against his former club the Predators in game six, winning his second consecutive Stanley Cup. Hörnqvist recorded nine points in 19 postseason contests.

On 27 February 2018, Hörnqvist signed a five-year, $26.5 million contract extension with the Penguins that would keep him under contract until the 2022–23 season.

On 4 December, Hörnqvist scored 3 goals within 2:47 minutes to help lead the Penguins 6–3 over the Colorado Avalanche. His hat-trick was the fastest recorded in Penguins history.

Florida Panthers
On 24 September 2020, Hörnqvist's six-year tenure with the Penguins ended after he agreed to waive his no-trade clause and was dealt to the Florida Panthers, in exchange for Mike Matheson and Colton Sceviour.

Career statistics

Regular season and playoffs

International

Awards and honors

References

External links
 

1987 births
Living people
Djurgårdens IF Hockey players
Florida Panthers players
Ice hockey players at the 2010 Winter Olympics
Nashville Predators draft picks
Nashville Predators players
Olympic ice hockey players of Sweden
Pittsburgh Penguins players
HC Red Ice players
Stanley Cup champions
Swedish ice hockey right wingers
Swedish expatriate ice hockey players in the United States
People from Sollentuna Municipality
Sportspeople from Stockholm County